Kevin Kuske (born 4 January 1979) is a former German bobsledder who competed from 1999 to 2018. Competing in five Winter Olympics, he is the most successful Olympic athlete in bobsledding, winning four gold medals and two silver medals.

Career 
Prior to his bobsleigh career, Kuske was a sprinter athlete, and won a bronze medal in 4 x 100 m at the 1998 World Junior Championships in Athletics.

At the 2002 Winter Olympics in Salt Lake City, Kuske, along with teammates André Lange, Carsten Embach, Enrico Kühn, won the gold medal in the four-man event. Four years later in Turin, Kuske paired with Lange to win the gold medal in the two-man event, while those two, along with teammates René Hoppe and Martin Putze, won gold in the four-man event. Kuske won gold in the two-man and silver in the four-man event at the 2010 Winter Olympics in Vancouver.

Kuske also has fifteen medals at the IBSF World Championships, including seven golds (two-man: 2003, 2007, 2008; four-man: 2003, 2004, 2005, 2008), four silvers (two-man: 2005, 2011; four-man: 2009, 2012), and four bronzes (two-man: 2004, 2012; four-man: 2007, 2017).

After pilot André Lange's retirement in 2010, Kevin Kuske started with pilots Thomas Florschütz and Maximilian Arndt. With Florschütz, he competed at the 2014 Winter Olympics in Sochi in both the two-man and four-man event, but failed to win any medals. After Florschütz and Arndt retired, Kuske joined the team of Nico Walther. In Walther's bobsleigh, Kuske won a silver medal in the four-man event at the 2018 Winter Olympics in Pyeongchang, therefore becoming the most successful bobsledder in Olympic history. Immediately after the Games, he announced his retirement.

References

External links 

 
 
 
 
 
 Bundswehr profile of Kuske 
 Bobsleigh four-man Olympic medalists for 1924, 1932–56, and since 1964 at sports123.com
 
 

1979 births
Living people
Sportspeople from Potsdam
German male sprinters
German male bobsledders
Bobsledders at the 2002 Winter Olympics
Bobsledders at the 2006 Winter Olympics
Bobsledders at the 2010 Winter Olympics
Bobsledders at the 2014 Winter Olympics
Bobsledders at the 2018 Winter Olympics
Olympic bobsledders of Germany
Olympic gold medalists for Germany
Olympic silver medalists for Germany
Olympic medalists in bobsleigh
Medalists at the 2018 Winter Olympics
Medalists at the 2010 Winter Olympics
Medalists at the 2006 Winter Olympics
Medalists at the 2002 Winter Olympics